North East Cork, a division of County Cork, was a parliamentary constituency in Ireland, represented in the Parliament of the United Kingdom. From 1885 to 1922 it returned one Member of Parliament (MP) to the House of Commons of the United Kingdom of Great Britain and Ireland.

Until the 1885 general election the area was part of the Cork County constituency. From 1922, on the establishment of the Irish Free State, it was not represented in the UK Parliament.

Boundaries
This constituency comprised the north-eastern part of County Cork, consisting of the baronies of Condons and Clangibbon and Kinnatalloon, that part of the barony of Fermoy not contained within the constituency of North Cork, that part of the barony of Barrymore contained within the parishes of Ardnageehy, Britway, Castlelyons, Coole, Dunbulloge, Gortroe, Kilshanahan, Knockmourne, Rathcormack, Templebodan and Whitechurch, and that part of the barony of Barretts contained within the parish of Mourne Abbey.

Members of Parliament

Elections

Elections in the 1880s

 Leamy resigns

Elections in the 1890s

In the 1892 United Kingdom general election William O'Brien (Irish Parliamentary Party) was returned for both North East Cork and Cork City. He chose to sit for Cork City, and a by-election was held for the vacant seat.

Being the only nominated candidate in the by-election, Michael Davitt took the seat unopposed on 8 February 1893. He resigned in May (after being threatened with bankruptcy) and a further by-election was held for which William Abraham was returned unopposed on 28 June.

Elections in the 1900s

Elections in the 1910s

In the January 1910 general election William O'Brien (All-for-Ireland League) was again returned for both North East Cork and Cork City. As usual, he chose to sit for Cork City, and a by-election was held for the vacant seat, which was taken unopposed by Maurice Healy (All-for-Ireland League) on 2 March 1910.

In the December 1910 general election North East Cork was won by Moreton Frewen (All-for-Ireland League) but his senior party colleague Tim Healy lost in North Louth. Frewen resigned so that Healy could stand in his vacated seat, and Healy was returned unopposed in the by-election on 16 July 1911.

References

Westminster constituencies in County Cork (historic)
Dáil constituencies in the Republic of Ireland (historic)
Constituencies of the Parliament of the United Kingdom established in 1885
Constituencies of the Parliament of the United Kingdom disestablished in 1922